Veshchevo is a rural locality on Karelian Isthmus, in Vyborgsky District of Leningrad Oblast, and a station of the Vyborg–Zhitkovo railroad. The railway track between Veshchevo and Zhitkovo was, however, dismantled in 2001. Until the Winter War and Continuation War, it had been the administrative center of the Heinjoki municipality of the Viipuri province of Finland. 

Air base

The locality hosts the Veshchevo air force base (also known as Vyborg East), located 23 km to the east of Vyborg. The 66 OMSHAP (66th Independent Naval Shturmovik Aviation Regiment) was based here with 45 Sukhoi Su-17M2 aircraft in the early 1990s.  On March 8, 1988, Aeroflot Flight 3739, a hijacked Tupolev Tu-154, which was parking at this airfield was captured by Soviet security forces. The field is now abandoned.

References

Rural localities in Leningrad Oblast
Installations of the Russian Navy
Soviet Naval Aviation bases
Karelian Isthmus